Sergei Sergeyevich Salnikov (13 September 1925 – 9 May 1984) was a Soviet footballer who played for Zenit Leningrad, Spartak Moscow and Dynamo Moscow. He was part of the Soviet Union national team that won the gold medal at the 1956 Olympics.

Club career
After two years with Zenit Leningrad, during which he scored against Spartak Moscow in the semifinal of the 1944 Soviet Cup, which Zenit ultimately won, Salnikov joined Spartak as a 21-year-old in 1946.  He won the Cup with Spartak in 1946 and 1947. Salnikov scored two goals and made another in the final match of the 1949 season against Dynamo Moscow, when Spartak narrowly missed out on the Soviet Top League title in a 5–4 defeat that some consider the greatest match of the era.

Salnikov's stepfather was arrested and sent to a labour camp in 1949. Salnikov, fearful for his health, made representations to have him transferred to an ordinary prison, and was allegedly told that it would help his case if he moved from Spartak to Dynamo Moscow. He joined Dynamo Moscow in 1950 and, although unhappy, was part of the first choice lineup between 1950 and 1954, making 113 appearances and scoring 29 goals. He was part of the Dynamo team that won the Cup in 1953 and the Soviet Top League in 1954. In 1955, with his stepfather out of danger, he returned to Spartak, where he remained until his retirement in 1960, winning the League again in 1956, and the League and Cup double in 1958. In the course of his two spells at Spartak, Salnikov made 201 appearances and scored 64 goals. Spartak star Nikita Simonyan considered Salnikov as one of the "golden generation" of Soviet players in the 1950s and 1960s.

International career
Salnikov made his debut for USSR on 8 September 1954 in a friendly against Sweden. He was on the USSR team that won the football event at the 1956 Summer Olympics, where he scored two goals in the quarterfinal match against Indonesia, and also played at the 1958 World Cup, where his team reached the quarter-finals. He made 20 appearances in all for his country, scoring 11 goals.

Personal life
Salnikov is the father of Soviet Fed Cup player Julia Salnikova and the grandfather of the Greek tennis players Stefanos Tsitsipas and Petros Tsitsipas. 

Salnikov was the son of a Russian father and a Greek mother.

Honours

 Olympic champion: 1956.
 Soviet Top League winner: 1954, 1956, 1958.
 Soviet Cup winner: 1944, 1946, 1947, 1953, 1958.
 Grigory Fedotov club member.

References

External links

 
 
 
 Sergei Salnikov at Сборная России по футболу 

1925 births
Sportspeople from Krasnodar
1984 deaths
Soviet footballers
Association football forwards
Soviet Union international footballers
Olympic footballers of the Soviet Union
Footballers at the 1956 Summer Olympics
Olympic gold medalists for the Soviet Union
1958 FIFA World Cup players
Soviet Top League players
FC Spartak Moscow players
FC Zenit Saint Petersburg players
FC Dynamo Moscow players
Soviet football managers
FC Fakel Voronezh managers
FC Spartak Moscow managers
Olympic medalists in football
Medalists at the 1956 Summer Olympics
Afghanistan national football team managers
Soviet expatriate football managers
Soviet people of Greek descent